Free Fall in Crimson (1981) is the nineteenth novel in the Travis McGee series by John D. MacDonald. In the plot McGee sets out to investigate the death of an ailing millionaire, and encounters a motorcycle gang, pornographic movie-makers, and balloonists. The book also revives the character of Lysa Dean from The Quick Red Fox, an early novel in the series. In the finale, McGee's longtime friend Meyer is terrified into submission by the main villain and judges himself a failure because his inaction almost led to disaster. This moral dilemma is resolved in the next novel, Cinnamon Skin.

References
 
 

1981 American novels
Travis McGee (novel series)